Oops!... I Did It Again may refer to:
 Oops!... I Did It Again (album) (2000)
 "Oops!... I Did It Again" (song) (2000)
 Oops!... I Did It Again Tour
 Oops! I Did It Again: The Best of Britney Spears (2012)
 Oops, I Did It Again! (Cex album) (2001)
 "Oops, I Did It Again", a 2004 episode of the American animated series The Powerpuff Girls